Stafford and Stone was county constituency in Staffordshire which returned one Member of Parliament (MP) to the House of Commons of the Parliament of the United Kingdom.

It was created in 1950 and abolished in 1983.

Boundaries
The Borough of Stafford, the Urban District of Stone, and the Rural Districts of Stafford and Stone.

Members of Parliament

Elections

Elections in the 1950s

Elections in the 1960s

Elections in the 1970s

References 

Parliamentary constituencies in Staffordshire (historic)
Borough of Stafford
Constituencies of the Parliament of the United Kingdom established in 1950
Constituencies of the Parliament of the United Kingdom disestablished in 1983